Broken Arrow is a city located in the northeastern part of the U.S. state of Oklahoma, primarily in Tulsa County, with a portion in western Wagoner County. It is the largest suburb of Tulsa. According to the 2020 census, Broken Arrow has a population of 113,540 residents and is the fourth-largest city in the state. The city is part of the Tulsa Metropolitan Area, which has a population of 1,023,988 residents.

The Missouri–Kansas–Texas Railroad sold lots for the town site in 1902 and company secretary William S. Fears named it Broken Arrow. The city was named for a Creek community settled by Creek Indians who had been forced to relocate from Alabama to Oklahoma along the Trail of Tears.

Although Broken Arrow was originally an agricultural community, its current economy is diverse. The city has the third-largest concentration of manufacturers in the state.

History
The city's name comes from an old Creek community in Alabama. Members of that community were expelled from Alabama by the United States government, along the Trail of Tears in the 1830s. The Creek founded a new community in the Indian Territory and named it after their old settlement in Alabama. The town's Creek name was Rekackv (pronounced thlee-Kawtch-kuh), meaning broken arrow. The new Creek settlement was located several miles south of present-day downtown Broken Arrow.

The community of Elam, located in present-day Broken Arrow near 145th East Avenue and 111th Street, began around 1901. It consisted of a cluster of stores, a cotton gin, and a few homes.

In 1902 the Missouri–Kansas–Texas Railroad planned a railroad through the area and was granted town site privileges along the route. They sold three of the as-yet-unnamed sites to the Arkansas Valley Town Site Company. William S. Fears, secretary of that company, was allowed to choose and name one of the locations. The MKT railroad, which was completed in 1903, ran through the middle of the city. It still exists today and is now owned by Union Pacific which currently uses it for freight.

For the first decades of Broken Arrow's history, the town's economy was based mainly on agriculture. The coal industry also played an important role, with several strip coal mines located near the city in the early 20th century. The city's newspaper, the Broken Arrow Ledger, started within a couple of years of the city's founding. Broken Arrow's first school was built in 1904. The city did not grow much during the first half of the 1900s. During this time Broken Arrow's main commercial center was along Main Street. Most of the city's churches were also located on or near Main Street as well. A 1907 government census listed Broken Arrow's population at 1,383.

The Haskell State School of Agriculture opened in the Broken Arrow, Oklahoma Opera House on November 15, 1909. The school closed in 1917 for lack of funding, and the building was then used as Broken Arrow High School. The building was razed in 1987. Only a marker remains at 808 East College Street in Broken Arrow. The front of cornerstone reads, "Haskell State School / Of Agriculture / J. H. Esslinger Supt. / W. A. Etherton Archt. / Bucy & Walker Contr." The side of cornerstone reads "Laid by the Masonic Fraternity / May 25, A. D. 1910, A. L. 5810. / George Huddell G. M. / Erected by The State Board of Agriculture / J. P. Conners Pres. / B. C. Pittuck Dean.". The school is commemorated on the National Register of Historic Places.

In the 1960s, Broken Arrow began to grow from a small town into a suburban city. The Broken Arrow Expressway (Oklahoma State Highway 51) was constructed in the mid-1960s and connected the city with downtown Tulsa, fueling growth in Broken Arrow. The population swelled from a little above 11,000 in 1970 to more than 50,000 in 1990, and then more than 74,000 by the year 2000. During this time, the city was more of a bedroom community. In recent years, city leaders have pushed for more economic development to help keep more citizens of Broken Arrow working, shopping, and relaxing in town rather than going to other cities.

Geography and climate
Broken Arrow is located in the northeastern corner of Oklahoma. The city is part of the state's Green Country region known for its green vegetation, hills and lakes. Green Country is the most topographically diverse portion of the state with seven of Oklahoma's 11 eco-regions.

Climate
Broken Arrow has the typical eastern and central Oklahoma humid subtropical climate (Köppen Cfa) with uncomfortably hot summers and highly variable winters that can range from mild to very cold depending on whether the air mass comes from warmed air over the Rocky Mountains or very cold polar anticyclones from Canada.

Demographics

According to the 2010 census, there were 98,850 people, 36,141 households, and 27,614 families residing in the city. The population density was 2,200 people per square mile (850/km). There were 38,013 housing units at an average density of 602.0 per square mile (232.4/km). The racial makeup of the city was 79.3% White, 4.3% African American, 5.2% Native American, 3.6% Asian (1.0% Vietnamese, 0.7% Indian, 0.4% Chinese, 0.3% Korean, 0.3% Hmong, 0.2% Pakistani, 0.2% Filipino, 0.1% Japanese), 0.05% Pacific Islander, 2.2% from other races, and 5.4% from two or more races. Hispanic or Latino were 6.5% (4.4% Mexican, 0.4% Puerto Rican, 0.3% Spanish, 0.1% Venezuelan, 0.1% Colombian).

There were 36,141 households, out of which 36.8% had children under the age of 18 living with them, 76.4% were married couples living together, 10.3% had a female householder with no husband present, and 23.6% were non-families. Of all households, 19.2% were made up of individuals, and 6.3% had someone living alone who was 65 years of age or older. The average household size was 2.72 and the average family size was 3.11.

In the city, the population dispersal was 30.8% under the age of 18, 7.7% from 18 to 24, 32.3% from 25 to 44, 21.6% from 45 to 64, and 7.5% who were 65 years of age or older. The median age was 33 years. For every 100 females, there were 95.1 males. For every 100 females age 18 and over, there were 91.2 males.

The median income for a household in the city was $65,385 and the median income for a family was $74,355. The per capita income for the city was $29,141. About 7.2% of the population were below the poverty line. Of the city's population over the age of 25, 30.3% hold a bachelor's degree or higher.

Business and industry

Broken Arrow is home to a wide range of businesses and industries. In fact, the city is ranked third in its concentration of manufacturers in the state.

Some of the city's more notable employers include:
 FlightSafety International
 FedEx Ground
 Blue Bell Creameries
 Windstream Communications
Located in Broken Arrow since 1985, FlightSafety International (FSI) designs and builds aviation crew training devices called Flight Simulators at its Simulation Systems Division. With currently over 675 employees located there, of which about half are engineers, FSI is the largest private employer in the city.

A number of new commercial developments are being built throughout the city, most notably along Oklahoma State Highway 51, which runs through the city. A Bass Pro Shops Outdoor World opened in 2005 as the anchor to a development that includes hotels, restaurants, shopping, and eventually offices. A new full-service hospital and medical office building were constructed nearby in 2010 as an anchor to another large commercial development that will include retail space and two hotels. Oklahoma's first Dick's Sporting Goods opened in late 2011.

In 2007 the city created the Broken Arrow Economic Development Corporation to help oversee economic development.

In late 2007, the Broken Arrow Chamber of Commerce began "Advance Broken Arrow", an economic development campaign aimed at expanding and diversifying the city's economic base.

Downtown redevelopment

In 2005, the city adopted a downtown revitalization master plan to help revive the city's historic downtown area. Some of the plans include a new 3-story museum to house the historical society and genealogical society, a farmer's market and plaza, a new performing arts center, updates and expansions to area parks, the conversion of the historic Central Middle School on Main Street into a professional development center, infrastructure, and landscape improvements, and incentives to encourage denser infill, redevelopment, and reuse of the area's historic structures. Numerous buildings and homes have since been renovated, many new shops and offices have moved to downtown, and new townhomes are being built. The new historical museum, farmers market, and performing arts center opened in 2008.

The city also sets strict new design standards in place that all new developments in the downtown area must adhere to. These standards were created to prevent "suburban" development in favor of denser, "urban" development, and to ensure that new structures complement and fit in with the historic buildings downtown. In October 2012 Downtown Broken Arrow's main street corridor was named the Rose District.

Government

Broken Arrow uses the council–manager model of municipal government. The city's primary authority resides in the city council which approves ordinances, resolutions, and contracts. The city council consists of five members with one member elected from each of the four city wards, and the fifth member as an at-large member. Each council member serves for a two-year term and is eligible to serve for four years. Out of the council members, a mayor and vice-mayor are chosen every two years. The day-to-day operations of the city are run by the city manager, who reports directly to the city council.

At the federal level, Broken Arrow lies within Oklahoma's 1st congressional district, represented by Kevin Hern. In the State Senate, Broken Arrow is in District 25 (Joe Newhouse) and 36 (Bill Brown). In the State House, District 75 (Karen Gaddis), 76 (Ross Ford), 98 (Michael Rogers) covers the city.

Education

Broken Arrow is served by Broken Arrow Public schools, Union Public Schools, Bixby public schools and Coweta public schools. Most of BA is served by BAPS while the northwestern part of town is Union Public Schools, far southwest part of town is Bixby Public Schools and the far southeastern part of town is Coweta Public Schools. The Coweta portion also includes large unincorporated tracts of land that may eventually be annexed into the city of Broken Arrow. Bixby, Union and Broken Arrow schools all operate at least one school in the city while the Coweta School District does not currently have any schools within the city limits.

Colleges and universities
Higher education in Broken Arrow is provided by Northeastern State University (Broken Arrow campus). The campus opened in 2001 and has an upperclassmen and graduate student population of 3,000.

Broken Arrow is also served by Tulsa Technology Center Broken Arrow Campus. Established in 1983, it has an enrollment of about 3,500 full- and part-time secondary and adult students.

RBTC is currently led by Hagin's son, Kenneth W. Hagin.

Libraries
The city's two libraries, Broken Arrow Library and South Broken Arrow Library, are part of the Tulsa City-County Library System.

Infrastructure
Major highways in Broken Arrow include State Highway 51 (Broken Arrow Expressway). It passes through the north side of the city and leads to downtown Tulsa to the northwest. Heading east on the Broken Arrow Expressway leads to the Muskogee Turnpike, which connects the city to Muskogee. Partial beltway Creek Turnpike circles around the south of the city and connects the Turner Turnpike to the west terminus of the Will Rogers Turnpike.

Public transportation for Broken Arrow is provided by Tulsa Transit. It has one route that connects the city to Tulsa. Bus services run Monday through Friday.

Media

Newspapers
Broken Arrow had one newspaper, the Broken Arrow Ledger. The paper was published every Wednesday. It is owned by BH Media Group. The Tulsa World, northeast Oklahoma's major daily newspaper, also features Broken Arrow news regularly. The staff at the Ledger featured journalists and photographers Lesa Jones, Doug Quinn, and G. B. Poindexter. The Ledger was closed by the Tulsa World’s owners in 2017.

Television
Cox Cable channel 24 is the Broken Arrow government-access television (GATV) cable TV municipal information channel. It displays, among other things, information about the city government, upcoming events, and general information about the city. The channel also features local weather reports.

Internet
Broken Arrow has a website that provides information on the city, its government, local amenities, safety, local news, and economic development. The city's chamber of commerce also has a website, which contains information about the chamber and economic development in the city.

Notable people
 David Alexander, former NFL player and former head coach of Broken Arrow High School football team
 Alvin Bailey, offensive lineman for the Seattle Seahawks
 Jim Baumer, former Major League infielder and general manager for Milwaukee Brewers
 Archie Bradley, pitcher for the Los Angeles Angels, drafted 7th overall in 2011 MLB first-year player draft
 Jim Brewer, former Major League pitcher with Los Angeles Dodgers
 P.C. Cast, author and novelist best known for the House of Night series
 Kristin Chenoweth, singer, actress and graduate of Broken Arrow High School. Broken Arrow Performing Arts Center's (PAC) theater and stage are named after Chenoweth.
 Ernest Childers, Medal of Honor recipient in World War II
 Marguerite Churchill, actress, died in Broken Arrow
 DeDe Dorsey, Las Vegas Locomotives running back, former NFL player with Cincinnati Bengals and Indianapolis Colts
 Ester Drang, indie rock band
 Phil Farrand, author known for Nitpicker's Guides
 Kenneth E. Hagin, evangelist and founder of Rhema Bible Training College
 Steve Logan, running backs coach for Tampa Bay Buccaneers
 JD McPherson, singer-songwriter and guitarist
 George O'Brien, actor
 Brad Penny, Major League Baseball pitcher
 Jamie Pinkerton, Head Women's Softball Coach at Iowa State University, graduate of Broken Arrow High School.
 Donald Roulet, Presbyterian minister and civil rights activist
 Warren Spahn, Hall of Fame baseball pitcher and longtime Broken Arrow resident
 Will Thomas, historical mystery writer, winner of 2005 and 2015 Oklahoma Book Award for fiction
 Andy Wilkins, first baseman for Milwaukee Brewers
 Kathryn Zaremba, stage actress

See also

 Broken Arrow killings

References

External links
 
 City website
 Chamber of Commerce
 "Broken Arrow," Encyclopedia of Oklahoma History and Culture

 
Cities in Tulsa County, Oklahoma
Cities in Wagoner County, Oklahoma
Cities in Oklahoma
Tulsa metropolitan area
Oklahoma populated places on the Arkansas River
Populated places established in 1902
1902 establishments in Indian Territory